Piccinino is an Italian surname. Notable people with the surname include:

Francesco Piccinino (c. 1407 – 1449), Italian condottiero
Jacopo Piccinino (1423–1465), Italian condottiero and nobleman
Niccolò Piccinino (1386–1444), Italian condottiero

Italian-language surnames